Rani Varma is a singer and recordist. She has also sung many songs as a playback singer. She is a daughter of Amar Varma, the famous Hindi/Urdu writer, poet, director & produce & well-known singer Manik Varma.

Early life
Rani was born in the renowned family of Amar Varma, the famous Hindi/Urdu writer, poet, director & producer and Padma Shri winner Manik Varma the doyen of Indian Classical music of Kirana Gharana, who also excelled in semi classical and light music like Thumrari, Natyasangeet, Bhajans and Bhavgeets and became a household name specially in Maharashtra. As the years passed by, along with the music inherited from her mother, she started taking Indian classical music lessons from Pandit Vasantrao Kulkarni from the childhood on her mother's insistence to have a regular and systematic knowledge, base and depth in music. Lookingg to her talent and potential, the famous music director of Indian Motion pictures Shri. C. Ramchandra gave her the first opportunity of singing in his concert,"Geet Gopal" as a solo singer at the age of nine. At 12, here first playback song "Pappa Saanga Kunache" and "He Rashtra Devatanche" for Marathi film Gharkul became super hits, where she captured the hears of millions with her sweet voice and confidence and from then she was lovingly and affectionately called as "Rani Varma". She continued singing with him for his live concerts "Bhulaye Na Bane" and became the wonder child singer.

Career
Rani made her playback debut in Ga Geet Tu Satari, in Marathi. She has sung many Marathi songs. She has done many albums for children including famous “Adam Tadam Tad Tad Baja”. Rani also owns a recording studio Saptak in Mumbai.

She was a part of project done by Ashok Hande on Manik Varma named "Manik Moti" with support by Bharati Achrekar and Vandana Gupte after Manik Varma's death.

Popular Songs
 गा गीत तू सतारी Ga Geet Tu Satari 
 जगणे अमुचे नका विचारू Jagane Amuche Naka Vicharu 
 तुला आळवीता जीवन Tula Aalavita Jeevan Sarave 
 तू सुखकर्ता तू दुःखहर्ता Tu Sukhakarta Tu
 पप्पा सांगा कुणाचे Pappa Sanga Kunache 
 मी मोठ्ठा होनार किनई Mi Mottha Honar Kinai
 संपले स्वप्‍न ते Sampale Swapna Te 
 हे राष्ट्र देवतांचे He Rashtra Devatanche

Albums
 Adam Tadam Tad Tad Baja

Personal life
Varma is a youngest daughter of Manik Varma. She has sisters, Aruna Jaiprakash, Bharati Achrekar, an actor and Vandana Gupte, a Marathi stage, film and television actor. Rani Varma was married to a Professional Engineer and hospitality investor Ashok  Patel and lived New Orleans USA until divorced in 2005.

References

Living people
Indian women classical singers
Hindustani singers
Indian women playback singers
Marathi people
Marathi playback singers
Marathi-language singers
Women Hindustani musicians
Year of birth missing (living people)